Sanjar Kuvvatov (Uzbek Cyrillic: Санжар Қувватов, ; born 8 January 1990) is an Uzbek footballer. The 5 ft 11 in goalkeeper plays for Uzbek League team Pakhtakor Tashkent FK. He's played for Uzbekistan at several youth levels, including the under-20 and -21 side.

He played all three of Uzbekistan's games in the 2009 FIFA U-20 World Cup in Egypt conceding six goals. Despite finishing third in Group D, the one point gained wasn't enough for Uzbekistan to advance to the knock-out rounds. Kuvvatov played against England under-21s on 10 August 2010 at Ashton Gate. Despite England having nearly all of the possession and taking an abundance of shots, the score was kept down to just 2–0, primarily because of Kuvvatov's shot-stopping.

References

External links

1990 births
Uzbekistani footballers
Uzbekistan international footballers
Living people
FK Mash'al Mubarek players
FC Nasaf players
Pakhtakor Tashkent FK players
Uzbekistan Super League players
Footballers at the 2010 Asian Games
Association football goalkeepers
2019 AFC Asian Cup players
Asian Games competitors for Uzbekistan